In mathematics, a Bailey pair is a pair of sequences satisfying certain relations, and a Bailey chain is a sequence of Bailey pairs.

Definition
The q-Pochhammer symbols   are defined as:

A pair of sequences (αn,βn) is called a Bailey pair if they are related by

or equivalently

Bailey's lemma
Bailey's lemma states that if (αn,βn) is  a Bailey pair, then so is (α'n,β'n) where

In other words, given one Bailey pair, one can construct a second using the formulas above. This process can be iterated to produce an infinite sequence of Bailey pairs, called a Bailey chain.

Examples
An example of a Bailey pair is given by 

 gave a list of 130 examples related to  Bailey pairs.

References

Special functions
Q-analogs